Scandlines is a ferry company that operates the Rødby–Puttgarden and Gedser–Rostock ferry routes between Denmark and Germany.

Scandlines owns 7 ferries, 6 of which are hybrid ferries, making Scandlines the owner of the world's largest fleet of hybrid ferries.

In a normal year, Scandlines has over 41,500 departures, 7 million passengers, 1.7 million passenger cars and approx. 700,000 freight units on its two routes.

Scandlines has two subsidiaries, Scandlines Danmark ApS and Scandlines Deutschland GmbH, which operate in the two main countries.

History 
Scandlines has a long history.

In 1903, the first railway ferry sailed between Gedser in Denmark and Warnemünde in Germany, where De Danske Statsbaner, DSB, operated the route from the Danish side in partnership with a state-owned German shipping company.

A second service, the 'bird's flight line' (die Vogelfluglinie in German) between Rødby and Puttgarden was added in 1963, creating a direct route between Copenhagen and Hamburg.

The company was separated from DSB in 1995, and transformed into an independent limited company called DSB Rederi, which was in turn rebranded Scandlines in 1997. In 1998, the two shipping company partners, Danish Scandlines and German DFO, merged into the company Scandlines, owned by the Danish Ministry of Transport and Deutsche Bahn.

Scandlines was privatized in 2007, and sold to the British infrastructure fund 3i, the German investment company Allianz Capital and the shipping company Deutsche Seereederei.

Between 1999 and 2015, part of Scandlines' ferry routes were sold, including Aarhus-Kalundborg to Molslinjen, and Helsingør-Helsingborg to ForSea Ferries.

Today, Scandlines is owned by a consortium consisting of the three infrastructure funds, First Sentier Investors, 3i and Federated Hermes.

The main focus is on the two routes Gedser-Rostock and Rødby-Puttgarden.

Management 
The top management consists of CEO Carsten Nørland, CFO Jesper Mikkelsen Heilbuth and COO Michael Guldmann Petersen.

The German part of the organization also has two directors: Heiko Kähler and Gerald Lefold, who are responsible for the day-to-day management of Scandlines' German companies.

Crossings 

Scandlines operates two ferry routes between Denmark and Germany.

Rødby – Puttgarden

Gedser – Rostock

Ferries 
Scandlines has six hybrid ferries and one freight ferry. In 2022, two ferry had a rotor sail mounted.

Scandlines' ferries on Rødby-Puttgarden:

Scandlines' ferries on Gedser-Rostock:

Freight ferry

In November 2021, it was announced that the company has ordered a battery-electric ferry for the Puttgarden-Rødby route from Cemre Shipyard. The new vessel is due to enter service in 2024 and will have two-deck loading alongside a freight capacity of 66 HGVs, or some 1200 lane metres.

Harbours 
Scandlines owns the harbours areas in Rødby, Gedser and Puttgarden and rents an area in the harbour of Rostock.

References

External links 

 

Ferry companies of Denmark
Ferry companies of Germany
3i Group companies
Companies based in Mecklenburg-Western Pomerania
Transport companies established in 1998